Serif PhotoPlus is an image editing program for Microsoft Windows. The latest version is Serif PhotoPlus X8. Presently Serif refers to this package as part of their Legacy range (following its replacement by their Affinity Photo product), meaning that no future updates will be released.

History 
 PhotoPlus 5: 1999.
 PhotoPlus 6: 1999.
 PhotoPlus 7: 2001.
 PhotoPlus 8: 2002.
 PhotoPlus 9: 2003.
 PhotoPlus 10: 2005.
 PhotoPlus 11: 25 September 2006.
 PhotoPlus X2: 29 October 2007.
 PhotoPlus X3: 11 May 2009.
 PhotoPlus X4: 12 July 2010.
 PhotoPlus X5: 12 September 2011.
 PhotoPlus X6: 3 December 2012.
 PhotoPlus X7: 28 April 2014.
 PhotoPlus X8: 10 August 2015.

See also

 Comparison of raster graphics editors
 Raster graphics editor
 Image editing
 Photo manipulation

References

External links 
 

Windows graphics-related software
C++ software
Raster graphics editors
Photo software
Year of introduction missing